The Burlington Cougars are a Canadian junior "A" ice hockey team from Burlington, Ontario. They are a part of the Ontario Junior Hockey League.

History
Founded in the early 1950s, the Burlington Mohawks found their footing in the Central Junior B Hockey League.  After seven seasons in the league and two league championships, the team was transferred to the Niagara District Junior B Hockey League.

In the Niagara League, the briefly renamed Industrials won both the 1963 and 1964 league championships before dropping down to Junior C in the late 1960s.

In 1970, the Mohawks jumped back up to the Junior B level in the Mid-Ontario Junior B Hockey League.  They were in the league for one season before the Ontario Hockey Association shifted them back to the Central Junior B Hockey League.

The Mohawks were renamed the Cougars in 1976 and stayed in the Central League for twenty-two seasons, from 1971 until 1993.

In 1981, the Cougars won their first Central League championship since 1958.  They went on to face the Stratford Cullitons of the Mid-Western Junior Hockey League in the Sutherland Cup final.  The Cougars won the series 8-points-to-4 to defeat the Cullitons and claim their only Sutherland Cup.

In 1987, the Cougars won their fourth and final Central League championship.

In 1993, the Central League was promoted to become the Ontario Provincial Junior A Hockey League, the Cougars made the jump with the league.  The Cougars have yet to win an OPJHL title.

The Cougars recently moved their home rink from Central Arena on Drury Lane to The Wave Twin Rinks on Mainway.

Season-by-season results

Playoffs
1994 Lost Quarter-final
Burlington Cougars defeated Georgetown Raiders 4-games-to-none
Oakville Blades defeated Burlington Cougars 4-games-to-none
1995 Lost Preliminary
Brampton Capitals defeated Burlington Cougars 4-games-to-1
1996 Did not qualify
1997 Did not qualify
1998 Lost Preliminary
Oakville Blades defeated Burlington Cougars 4-games-to-2
1999 Lost Division Quarter-final
Georgetown Raiders defeated Burlington Cougars 3-games-to-1
2000 Lost Division Semi-final
Burlington Cougars defeated Milton Merchants 4-games-to-3
Georgetown Raiders defeated Burlington Cougars 4-games-to-3
2001 Did not qualify
2002 Did not qualify
2003 Lost Division Quarter-final
Oakville Blades defeated Burlington Cougars 4-games-to-none
2004 Lost Division Quarter-final
Oakville Blades defeated Burlington Cougars 4-games-to-none
2005 Lost Division Quarter-final
Milton Icehawks defeated Burlington Cougars 4-games-to-1
2006 Lost Division Quarter-final
Oakville Blades defeated Burlington Cougars 4-games-to-1
2007 Lost Division Quarter-final
Georgetown Raiders defeated Burlington Cougars 4-games-to-2
2008 Lost Division Quarter-final
Brampton Capitals defeated Burlington Cougars 3-games-to-none
2009 Lost Division Semi-final
Burlington Cougars defeated Milton Icehawks 3-games-to-none
Oakville Blades defeated Burlington Cougars 4-games-to-1
2010 Lost CCHL Semi-final
Burlington Cougars defeated North York Rangers 4-games-to-none
Burlington Cougars defeated Streetsville Derbys 4-games-to-none
Newmarket Hurricanes defeated Burlington Cougars 4-games-to-none
2011 Lost Quarter-final
Burlington Cougars defeated Hamilton Red Wings 4-games-to-none
Oakville Blades defeated Burlington Cougars 4-games-to-2
2012 Lost Division Semi-final
Burlington Cougars defeated Milton Icehawks 3-games-to-1
Georgetown Raiders defeated Burlington Cougars 4-games-to-1

Sutherland Cup appearances
1981: Burlington Cougars defeated Stratford Cullitons 8-points-to-4

Notable alumni
Kevin Bieksa
Tim Bothwell
Eric Cairns
Greg Carey
Paul Crowley
Dan Currie
Bob Dillabough
Steve Durbano
Paul Henderson
Larry Jeffrey
Jeff Johnson (running back - CFL)
Josh Jooris
Rick Lanz
Mark Lawrence
Lowell MacDonald
Pit Martin
Scott McKay
John Miszuk
Lance Nethery
Danny Olesevich
Murray Oliver
Pat Quinn
Dennis Ribant (pitcher - MLB)
Wayne Rivers
Ron Sedlbauer
Fred Speck
Steve Valiquette
Mark Visheau
Chad Wiseman
Dino Felicetti

External links
Cougars Website

Ontario Provincial Junior A Hockey League teams
Burlington, Ontario
1952 establishments in Ontario
Ice hockey clubs established in 1952